Early One Morning is a 1962 sculpture by British artist Anthony Caro. It has been held by the Tate Gallery in London since 1965.

The abstract sculpture is an arrangement of metal parts painted red, with no obvious focus or representative elements.  It comprises a collection of planes and lines arranged along a horizontal axis, with an appearance of lightness that belies its heavy construction.  The work measures .  The self-supporting work rests on the floor, with no plinth, to be viewed in the round.

Caro was an assistant to Henry Moore in the 1950s, but the works of David Smith inspired Caro to move decisively away from Moore's semi-figurative sculpture towards more abstract works constructed from industrial metal elements.  The sculpture was made at Caro's home, but the large work could not be properly viewed in the confined space, so Caro and a friend took it to pieces late at night and reassembled it outside.  The name comes from Caro's first proper view of the work, early the next morning.  It was originally painted green, to unify the disparate elements into one piece.  Caro was unhappy with the result, and Caro's wife Sheila suggested painting it red instead.

The complete sculpture was first exhibited at the Whitechapel Art Gallery in the autumn of 1963, and was included in the exhibition of modern sculpture at the British Pavilion at the Venice Biennale in 1966.

It was acquired from the artist by the Contemporary Art Society in 1965, and presented to the Tate Gallery later that year.

References
 Early One Morning, Tate Gallery
 Sir Anthony Caro – Early One Morning 1962, Tate Gallery, 26 January 2005 
 "Sculptor Sir Anthony Caro on Early One Morning", BBC News, 19 January 2011
 Early One Morning, Google Arts & Culture
 "My life in art: How Anthony Caro's steel works stole my heart", The Guardian, 22 October 2008

1962 sculptures
Sculptures by Anthony Caro
Sculptures of the Tate galleries